Nicole Yorkin is an American television writer and producer. In 1997, she shared an Emmy Award nomination with several producers of Chicago Hope in the category "Outstanding Drama Series". In 2003, she and her partner Dawn Prestwich won a Writers Guild of America (WGA) award for the pilot episode of the episodic drama The Education of Max Bickford.

Biography
She is the daughter of the late Jewish filmmaker Bud Yorkin.

In 2009, Prestwich and Yorkin joined the crew of new ABC science fiction drama FlashForward as consulting producers and writers. The series was co-created by David S. Goyer and Brannon Braga. The show follows a team of FBI agents investigating a global blackout that gave victims a vision of their future. Prestwich and Yorkin co-wrote the teleplay for the episode "Gimme Some Truth" based on a story by Barbara Nance. They also co-wrote the episodes "Believe" and "Goodbye Yellow Brick Road".

She co-created the period drama Z: The Beginning of Everything with Prestwich in 2015.

In 2019, Yorkin was on the negotiating committee for the "WGA-Agency Agreement", and joined other WGA members in firing her agents as part of the guild's stand against the ATA after the two sides were unable to come to an agreement on a new "Code of Conduct" that addressed the practice of packaging.

Credits (selected)
 Melrose Place (1993) - writer
 Judging Amy (1999–2001) - writer and co-executive producer
 Carnivàle (2003–2005) - writer and co-executive producer
 Battlestar Galactica (2005) - writer
 Brotherhood (2006) - writer and co-executive producer
 The Riches (2007–2008) - writer and co-executive producer
 FlashForward (2009–2010) - writer and consulting producer
 The Killing (2011–2014) - writer and executive producer
 Z: The Beginning of Everything (2015–2017) - creator, writer and co-executive producer

References

External links
 

American television producers
American women television producers
American television writers
Jewish American writers
Living people
American women television writers
Writers Guild of America Award winners
Place of birth missing (living people)
Year of birth missing (living people)
21st-century American Jews
21st-century American women